Owen is usually an anglicised variant of the Welsh personal name . Originally a patronymic, Owen became a fixed surname in Wales beginning with the reign of Henry VIII. Etymologists consider it to originate from Eugene meaning 'noble-born'. Morgan and Morgan note that there are less likely alternative explanations, and agree with Rachel Bromwich that Welsh  "is normally latinised as ", and that both the Welsh and Irish forms are Latin derivatives.

As such, the given name Owney is usually regarded as a diminutive of either Owen or Eoghan. However, another Irish name,  (/ˈuənʲə/, meaning 'wood', 'work', 'pillar', or 'harmony') has also sometimes been anglicised as Owney.

The anglicisation of the French digraph ou to ow is common in words such as  > coward, and Old French  > power,  > tower, etc.

A relatively uncommon English surname, Owin, has also sometimes been spelt Owen.



The following notable people have Owen as a surname or first name.

Surname

A–E
Alfred Owen (footballer, born 1880), English footballer
Amanda Owen (born 1974), "the Yorkshire Shepherdess" and writer
Beverley Owen (1937–2019), American actress
Bill Owen (actor) (1914–1999), English actor, father of Tom Owen
Bill Owen (baseball), American college baseball coach
Bradley Owen (born 1950), American politician
Chris Owen (actor) (born 1980), American actor
Chris Owen (director) (1944–2018), Australian film director
Cliff Owen (1919–1993), British TV and film director
Clive Owen (born 1964), English actor
Dale Owen (1924–1997), Welsh architect  
Daniel Owen (1836–1895), Welsh novelist
David Owen, several people
Dicky Owen (1876–1932), Welsh international rugby union player
Don Owen (1930–2012), Louisiana television anchorman and politician
Edmund Owen (1847–1915), English surgeon
Eleanor Owen (1921–2022), American journalist and actress
Elias Owen (Welsh cleric) (1833–1899), Welsh cleric and antiquary
Elias Owen (footballer) (1863–1888), Welsh international footballer
Elias K. Owen (1834–1877), United States Navy officer.
Evelyn Owen (1915–1949), Australian designer of the Owen submachine gun

F–M
Francis Owen (philologist) (1886–1975), Canadian philologist and military officer
Gareth Owen (footballer born 1971), Welsh footballer
Gareth Owen (footballer born 1982), Welsh footballer
Gilberto Owen (1904–1952), Mexican poet
Gordon Owen (born 1959), English footballer
Greg Owen (golfer) (born 1972), English golfer
Greg Owen (activist) British HIV/AIDS activist
Gwilym Ellis Lane Owen (1922–1982), Welsh philosopher
Henry Owen (1716–1795), Welsh theologian
Huw Parri Owen (1926–1996), Welsh theologian, writer and academic
Ian Owen (born 1948), former Australian rules footballer
 Sir Isambard Owen (1850–1927), British physician and university academic
Jake Owen (born 1981), American singer
James Owen, several people
Jane Owen (born 1963), British ambassador
Jimmy Owen (1864–??), English footballer
John Owen, several people
Kai Owen (born 1975), Welsh actor
Kenneth Owen (1918–2001), American farmer and politician
Larry Owen (1955–2018), American baseball player
Laurence Owen (1944–1961), American figure skater
Laurence Owen (composer) (born 1989), British composer and entertainer
Lewis Owen, several people
Lloyd Owen (born 1966), English actor
Lucy Owen (born 1971), Welsh newsreader
Maria Tallant Owen (1825–1913), American botanist
Mark Owen (born 1972), English musician and member of Take That
Marv Owen (1906–1991), American baseball player, manager, and scout
Mary Owen, several people
May Owen (1892–1988), Texas physician
Michael Owen, several people

N–Z
Nick Owen (born 1947), English television presenter and newsreader
Nora Owen (born 1945), Irish politician
Orville Ward Owen (1854–1924), American physician and Baconian
Peter Owen, makeup artist
Priscilla Owen (born 1954), American judge on the 5th Circuit Court of Appeals
Randy Owen (born 1949), American country musician
Ray Owen (1941–2006), English rugby league footballer
Reginald Owen (1887–1972), English actor
Richard Owen, several people
Robert Owen, several people
Roger Owen, several people
Russell Owen (1889–1952), American journalist
Ruth Bryan Owen (1885–1954), member of Congress and U.S. ambassador
Samuel Owen (1769?–1857), maritime artist
Sarah Owen, British Member of Parliament elected 2019
Scott Owen (born 1975), double bass player for Australian rock band The Living End
Sid Owen (born 1972), English actor
Siobhan Owen (born 1993), Australian harpist
Sue Owen, several people
Susan Owen, American operatic soprano
Syd Owen (1927–1999), English footballer
Tanner Owen (born 1996), American football player
Thomas Owen, several people
Walter Owen, several people
Wilfred Owen (1893–1918), British World War I poet
William Fitzwilliam Owen (1774–1857), British naval officer, hydrographer, and explorer
William Owen, several people

First name

A–J
Owen I of Strathclyde, King of Strathclyde (in the western part of modern Scotland)
Owen Aspinall (1927–1997), 45th Governor of American Samoa
Owen Astrachan (born 1956), Duke University computer scientist
Owen Biddle, several people
Owen M. Begley (1906–1981), New York politician
Owen Bennett (born 1985), British former journalist
Owen Bradley (1915–1998), American country music producer
Owen Cheung (born 1987), Hong Kong actor
Owen Clarke, English musician, member of band Hot Chip
Owen Coyle (born 1966), Irish professional football player and current manager of Queen's Park in Scotland
Owen Daniels (born 1982), American professional football player
Owen Davis (1874–1956), American Pulitzer Prize-winning playwright
Owen Farrell (born 1991), English rugby union player
Owen Franks (born 1987), New Zealand rugby union player
Owen Da Gama (born 1961), South African football manager
Owen Garriott (1930–2019), American Skylab and Space Shuttle astronaut
Owen Garvan (born 1988), Irish footballer
Owen Hargreaves (born 1981), English footballer
Owen Harris (1837–1905), Welsh politician
Owen Harris (director), British film and television director
Owen Hart (1965–1999), Canadian professional wrestler
Owen Hatherley (born 1981), British writer and journalist
Owen Husney (born 1947), American music manager and record executive
Owen Johnson, several people
Owen Jones, several people

H–Z
Owen Hale (born 1947), American drummer for Lynyrd Skynyrd
Owen Kelly (born 1977), Australian race car driver
Owen King (born 1977), American author
Owen Klassen (born 1991), Canadian basketball player
Owen Lovejoy (1811–1864), American lawyer and politician
Owen Mulligan (born 1981), three-time All-Ireland SFC winning Tyrone player
Owen Nolan (born 1972), Northern Irish hockey player
Owen Oyston (born 1934), English businessman and convicted rapist
Owen Pallett (born 1979), Canadian songwriter and winner of the inaugural Polaris Music Prize
Owen Pappoe (born 2000), American football player
Owen Rinehart, American polo player
Owen Roberts, several people
Owen Roizman (1936–2023), American cinematographer
Owen Ronald (born 1993), Scottish footballer
Owen Rutter (1889–1944), English historian, novelist and travel writer
Owen Schmitt (born 1985), American football player
Owen Shannon (1879–1918), American baseball player
 Owen Suskind, son of Ron Suskind and star of the 2016 documentary film, Life, Animated
Owen Ray Skelton (1886–1969), American automotive engineer
Owen Tippett (born 1999), Canadian ice hockey winger
Owen Tudor (c. 1400 – 1461), Welsh ancestor of the Tudor dynasty
Owen Von Richter (born 1975), Canadian medley swimmer
Owen Walter (born 1979), Canadian ice hockey defenceman
Owen Warner (born 1999), English actor
Owen Wilson (born 1968), American actor
Owen D. Young (1874–1962), American businessman, lawyer, and diplomat

Fictional characters
Owen (Black Clover), a character in the manga series Black Clover
Owen, a character from the animated reality series Total Drama
Owen Grady, protagonist of Jurassic World
 Owen Green, a character in the podcast The Bright Sessions
Owen Harper, protagonist in the television series Torchwood
Owen Hunt in Grey's Anatomy
Owen Lars in the Star Wars universe, step-uncle of Luke Skywalker
 Owen Lift, son of Momma Lift in Throw Momma from the Train
 Owen Marshall, protagonist defense attorney in the television series Owen Marshall, Counselor at Law
Owen Meany, title character in John Irving's novel A Prayer For Owen Meany
Owen Mercer, one of two characters to inherit the name of Captain Boomerang and a supervillain in DC Comics
 Owen Milgrim, a main character in the miniseries Maniac
Owen Milligan from the Degrassi series
 Owen Moore from the action-adventure video game, The Last of Us Part II
Owen Paris from the Star Trek franchise 
 Owen Quine, writer killed in J. K. Rowling's novel The Silkworm
Owen Tillerman, a main character in the TV series Central Park
 Owen Underhill in King's novel Dreamcatcher
 Owen Wells in Gabrielle Zevin's novel Elsewhere
 Owen Lawton in Karen McManus's novel One of Us Is Next
 Owen the Incline Engine, a character from the children's television series Thomas and Friends.
 Owen Manning, Son Of Dr Natalie Manning from Chicago Med

See also
 Several Owen baronetcies
 Ab Owain
 Ab Owen
Bowen (surname)
 Bowens (surname)
 Bown
 Bowne
 Bownes
Owens (surname)

References

English masculine given names
English-language masculine given names
English-language surnames
Welsh masculine given names
Surnames of Welsh origin
Anglicised Welsh-language surnames
Unisex given names
Lists of people by given name

cs:Owen